The Second Chifley ministry (Labor) was the 33rd ministry of the Government of Australia. It was led by the country's 16th Prime Minister, Ben Chifley. The Second Chifley Ministry succeeded the First Chifley ministry, which dissolved on 1 November 1946 following the federal election that took place in September. The ministry was replaced by the Fourth Menzies ministry on 19 December 1949 following the federal election that took place on 10 December which saw the Liberal–Country Coalition defeat Labor.

Nelson Lemmon, who died in 1989, was the last surviving member of the Second Chifley Ministry.

Ministry

Notes

Ministries of George VI
Chifley, 2
Australian Labor Party ministries
1946 establishments in Australia
1949 disestablishments in Australia
Cabinets established in 1946
Cabinets disestablished in 1949